Loke v Tuhinju is a village in the Tuhinj Valley in the Municipality of Kamnik in the Upper Carniola region of Slovenia.

Church

The local church is dedicated to Saint Thomas. It was built in the Baroque style between 1726 and 1732. Its main altar also dates to the first half of the 18th century.

References

External links

Loke v Tuhinju on Geopedia

Populated places in the Municipality of Kamnik